Condicote is a small village in Gloucestershire, England. It is near the A424 road. It has a small church dedicated to St Nicholas. It has evidence of Pre-Roman inhabitants, with an example of a henge.

References

External links

Condicote at Streetmap.co.uk
'Parishes: Condicote', A History of the County of Gloucester: volume 6 (1965), pp. 63-72.

Villages in Gloucestershire
Cotswold District